CHLS-FM is a Canadian radio station, broadcasting at 100.5 FM in Lillooet, British Columbia. The station airs a community radio format branded as Radio Lillooet.

The station received approval in 2003.

References

External links
 radiolillooet.ca - CHLS-FM
CHLS-FM history - Canadian Communication Foundation
 

HLS
HLS
Radio stations established in 2003
2003 establishments in British Columbia